Easy to Love may refer to:
 "You'd Be So Easy to Love", a song by Cole Porter
 Easy to Love (1934 film), starring Genevieve Tobin and Adolphe Menjou
 Easy to Love (1953 film), starring Esther Williams
 Easy to Love (Buck Hill album)
 Easy to Love (Jaydee Bixby album)
 Easy to Love (The Singers Unlimited album, 1981)
 Easy to Love (Kalil Wilson album)
 Easy to Love (Roland Hanna album)
 Easy to Love, 2006 album by Roberta Gambarini
 Easy to Love, a song by The Jezabels from their 2009 EP She's So Hard and their 2011 album Prisoner
 "Easy to Love" (For Real song)
 Easy to Love (Leo Sayer song), a song by Leo Sayer from Thunder in My Heart
 "Easy to Love", a 2014 song by Bucie